Daniel Alfonso Coronell Castañeda (Bogotá, October 25 of 1964) is a Colombian journalist and columnist. He has been news director for RCN, Noticias Uno and president of Univision News, the news division of Univision, until August 1, 2021. In September 2021 he was appointed as president of the weekly news magazine Cambio. In October 2021, Coronell started working for W Radio Colombia.

For fourteen consecutive years he has been chosen as the most read columnist by opinion leaders in Colombia according to a 2020 poll carried out by the agency Cifras y Conceptos. His op-ed column, the most widely read in Colombia, used to be published in Semana, but following his departure from the weekly magazine it started being published in the online portal Los Danieles, which he co-created with Daniel Samper Ospina, and which features op-eds by Antonio Caballero (until his death in 2021), Ana Bejarano, and Daniel Samper Pizano.

Coronell has uncovered some of the great scandals of recent years. Among others, the case of Yair Klein, the negligence of the Colombian government to guard Pablo Escobar during his incarceration, revealed the calls that linked Ernesto Samper with Elizabeth Montoya of Sarria, and numerous complaints related to the former president including the illegal purchase of parliamentary votes that allowed his re-election, a scandal known as  yidispolitica. Álvaro Uribe.,

Coronell was the victim of multiple threats that forced him into exile. In the 2002 received threats after publishing that, in 1984, a helicopter belonging to President Álvaro Uribe's father had been found in a coca laboratory in Tranquilandia. The aircraft had obtained its license when Álvaro Uribe was director of the Civil Aeronautics. In September 2005, Coronell had to leave the country and live in exile for two years for r death threats made to him and his family.

Education and career 

Coronell graduated at the Colegio Mayor de Nuestra Señora del Rosario in Bogotá and obtained a degree in journalism from the Universidad Externado de Colombia. He completed his graduate studies in Switzerland and Spain. He also wrote an opinion column for the weekly news magazine Semana. He has taught at the Javeriana, and Externado de Colombia universities in Colombia, and has been a member of the teaching staff for the Masters Program on Journalism at the Universidad de los Andes. He was a Senior Research Fellow of the Knight Fellowship at Stanford University, as well as a researcher and senior visiting scholar of the University of California, Berkeley.

Threats and exile 
Coronell is well known for his views and investigations in the Colombian and world news. His writings have criticized the government of the former president Álvaro Uribe Vélez and paramilitary leaders.

In August 2005 he had to go into exile with his wife, journalist and anchorwoman María Cristina Uribe (who at the time presented Noticias Uno), and their daughter. His loved ones had been persistently threatened through phone calls, funeral wreaths and anonymous e-mails. According to Coronell's own research, confirmed by the authorities, the former congressman Carlos Náder Simmonds, who resides in Spain and is mentioned by Fernando Garavito.

Coronell and his family decided to come back to Colombia in July 2007, where a few months later, as a result of his op-eds and news reports critical of President Uribe's government, he had an improvised argument with the latter on-the air, through La FM, a national radio network.

Awards
Coronell has been awarded with eight Emmy awards and the prestigious Simón Bolívar National Journalism Award on seven occasions:
1987: Best TV Chronicle
1989: Best Journalistic Report
1992: Best Cultural Report
2007: Best Opinion Column
2008: Best TV News Follow-up Report and Best Investigative Report for TV
2013: Journalist of the year

In 2009 he was granted the highest award for a TV investigative report by the Fundación Nuevo Periodismo Iberoamericano - Cemex, for "Un crimen casi perfecto" (An Almost Perfect Crime) together with a team of journalists from Noticias Uno. The program was broadcast in 2007. In 2009, he was honored with an Oxfam Novib/PEN Award.

See also
Noticias Uno

References

External links
Daniel Coronell's column in Semana magazine
Journalist forced to leave the country because of threats
"I rather leave than remain silent"
Official Home Page for Daniel Coronell

Living people
Colombian television journalists
Oxfam Novib/PEN Award winners
1964 births